Willi Reiland (2 November 1993 – 14 November 2015) was a German politician. He was lord mayor of the Lower Franconian town of Aschaffenburg in Bavaria, Germany, for thirty years.

Early life and career 
In 1946, when Reiland was aged twelve, he and his family were expelled out of Czechoslovakia. They moved to Haibach in Lower Franconia, Germany.

He attended secondary school in Aschaffenburg, then studied law in Würzburg, receiving his doctorate in 1960.

A decade later, Reiland was made lord mayor of Aschaffenburg, a role in which he remained for thirty years. He retired on 30 April 2000.

Personal life 
In 1962, Reiland married Elvira Hattig, with whom he had two sons.

In 1977, the couple were presented to the Queen Elizabeth II and Prince Philip, Duke of Edinburgh, during a visit to Perth, Scotland, a twin town of Aschaffenburg. Eleven years later, Reiland opened Perth's St John's Shopping Centre.

Death 
Reiland died in 2015, aged 82. He was interred in an honorary grave in Aschaffenburg's Old Town Cemetery.

Further reading 
 Carsten Pollnick: Aschaffenburger Stadtoberhäupter Würzburg: Volksblatt Verlagsgesellschaft mbH 1983, ISBN 3-429-00875-1
 Stadt Aschaffenburg – Dr. Willi Reiland Oberbürgermeister der Stadt Aschaffenburg 1970–2000 ISBN 3-922355-23-4

References 

1933 births
2015 deaths
People from Trutnov
Mayors of places in Bavaria
Czechoslovak lawyers